John Bheki Nkambule (born 4 January 1981) is a South African professional footballer who plays as a midfielder.

Nkambule has played in the Premier Soccer League for Supersport United and Jomo Cosmos, and for PFC Pirin Blagoevgrad in the Bulgarian B PFG.

External links
Jomo Cosmos profile

1981 births
Living people
South African soccer players
SuperSport United F.C. players
Jomo Cosmos F.C. players
Association football midfielders